Fox Chapel Country Day School became Shady Side Academy's second elementary campus in 2017 after a merger between the two institutions. Previously known as Fox Chapel Country Day School, the school was renamed Shady Side Academy Country Day School in Fox Chapel beginning with the 2017–2018 school year.

Founded in 1948 as Fox Chapel Country Day School (FCCDS), the school began with 18 children in a nursery school class, housed on the third floor of Fox Chapel Community Church (now Christ Church Fox Chapel). In the 1950s, the search began for a permanent location for the school, and a grade level was added each year to grow the school through fifth grade.

In 1960, Richard K. Whiteman was appointed head of school, a tenure that would last for 40 years. In 1970, FCCDS became accredited by the Pennsylvania Association of Private Academic Schools (PAPAS).

While continuing to share space with the church, the school reconfigured the facilities to suit its needs. In 1999, a major addition to join two buildings and create a new space for pre-kindergarten and kindergarten classrooms was completed. The playground was replaced in 2011.

Country Day's campus is less than a mile down the road from SSA Middle School, and it overlooks the SSA Senior School athletic complex across the road. Merger between Fox Chapel Country Day School and Shady Side Academy occurred in 2017.

Notes

External links
 

Private elementary schools in Pennsylvania
Educational institutions established in 1947
1947 establishments in Pennsylvania